"Spread Your Love" is a song recorded by Belgian/Dutch Eurodance band 2 Unlimited. It was released in May 1996 as the third and final new single from their greatest hits compilation album, Hits Unlimited. The single scored chart success in some European countries peaking highest in Spain at number 10.  It also charted in the Netherlands at number 13. The single was not released in the United Kingdom.

"Spread Your Love" was only released in a few European territories and a studio video was not filmed for the track. Instead, footage of live performances fused with computer generated graphics were used. By the time this single was released, the duo had announced their split.

Track listing
 CD single
 "Spread Your Love" (Radio Edit) (3:50)
 "Spread Your Love" (Digidance Happy Hardcore Edit) (3:51)

 CD maxi
 "Spread Your Love" (Radio Edit) (3:50)
 "Spread Your Love" (Digidance Happy Hardcore Edit) (3:51)
 "Spread Your Love" (Tokapi's Radio Edit) (3:17)
 "Spread Your Love" (Extended) (7:21)
 "Spread Your Love" (Sash! Remix) (5:47)
 "Spread Your Love" (La Casa Di Tokapi) (5:32)

 7" single
 "Spread Your Love" (Radio Edit) (3:50)
 "Spread Your Love" (Tokapi's Radio Edit) (3:17)

 12" maxi
 "Spread Your Love" (Sash! Remix) (5:47)
 "Spread Your Love" (Itty-Bitty-Boozy-Woozy's Blue Love Mix) (6:01)
 "Spread Your Love" (Digidance Happy Hardcore Extended Mix) (5:38)
 "Spread Your Love" (La Casa Di Tokapi) (5:32)

Charts

References

1996 singles
2 Unlimited songs
1995 songs
Electronic songs
Eurodance songs
Songs written by Phil Wilde
Songs written by Ray Slijngaard
Songs written by Anita Doth
Byte Records singles
ZYX Music singles
Songs written by Peter Bauwens